Javier Andorrà Julia (born 7 June 1985) is an Andorran international footballer who plays for the B-team of FC Andorra as a forward.

Career
He has played for FC Andorra, CD Benicarló, CF Gimnástico Alcázar, CD Binéfar, Inter Club d'Escaldes and FC Lusitanos.

He made his international debut for Andorra in 2005.

References

External links
Xavi Andorrà at La Preferente

1985 births
Living people
Andorran footballers
Andorra international footballers
FC Andorra players
CF Gimnástico Alcázar players
CD Binéfar players
Inter Club d'Escaldes players
FC Lusitanos players
Association football forwards
Andorran expatriate footballers
Andorran expatriate sportspeople in Spain
Expatriate footballers in Spain